Extended area service (EAS) is a telephony term that deals with calling a wider area beyond the exchange without long distance or toll charges.

EAS can be a flat rate, message or measured and also it can be zoned as well. It can be optional or be mandated by government regulations.

In Canada, EAS is still regulated by the CRTC, even though local service is subject to competition.  In Canada, EAS is usually reflected as the appropriate monthly rate group for the number of lines that can be dialed toll-free - a small community gaining EAS with a large city usually means the large city's monthly rate applies to the small community.  The rate alternately may be represented by a visible and separate charge, but is often much higher for the small community.

EAS in Canada is often instigated by customers who request toll-free calling to a frequently-called nearby exchange. The carrier will provide a ballot to customers in the two exchanges to determine whether the service is supported at the proposed increase in monthly rates. Any exchanges located between the two are included in the upgrade and reflected in the rate increase.

EAS is more common in areas with contiguous rural occupancy, and is rare for communities separated by undeveloped wilderness.  It is usually driven by a common market or community interest, or the dependency of a small community on the larger one.  Just as telephone company exchange areas do not correspond with municipal boundaries, not all areas of a large municipality may enjoy the same EAS area (the Lambeth exchange serving part of London, Ontario, does not have as many exchanges in its EAS area as the London exchange area).

EAS across an international border is rare, and is usually a relic of former common-ownership or a single exchange serving both communities.  Surviving examples include Sweet Grass, MT - Coutts, AB (separate exchanges on the border); Stewart, BC - Hyder, AK (Hyder served by Stewart exchange); Estcourt Station, QC - Estcourt, ME (served by Estcourt Station exchange).

Telephone services